The 2006 FIFA World Cup qualification CAF Group 2 was a CAF qualifying group for the 2006 FIFA World Cup. The group comprised Burkina Faso, Cape Verde, Congo DR, Ghana, South Africa and Uganda.

The group was won by Ghana, who qualified for the 2006 FIFA World Cup. Ghana, Congo DR and South Africa qualified for the 2006 Africa Cup of Nations.

Second round

Standings

Results

2